Cassinia heleniae is a species of flowering plant in the family Asteraceae and is endemic to a small area in northern New South Wales. It is a shrub with a few sticky stems, sticky needle-shaped leaves and flower heads arranged in a rounded to flat-topped cyme.

Description
The lower surface of the leaves is densely covered with cottony hairs. The flower heads are arranged in round to flat-topped cymes, each head with five to seven white florets surrounded by papery involucral bracts. The achenes are olive brown with a bristly pappus of 19 to 25 bristles.

Taxonomy and naming
Cassinia heleniae was first formally described in 2005 by Anthony Edward Orchard in Australian Systematic Botany from specimens he collected in Torrington State Park in 2004. The specific epithet (heleniae) honours Helen Thompson of the Australian Biological Resources Study.

Distribution and habitat
This species of Cassinia is only known from the area around Torrington where it grows in forest in soils derived from granite.

References

heleniae
Asterales of Australia
Flora of New South Wales
Plants described in 2005